Bridgend County Borough stretches from the south coast of Wales up to the southern edge of the Brecon Beacons. The 57 scheduled monuments cover over 4,000 years of the history of this part of South Wales. There are chambered tombs of the Neolithic, and burial cairns and standing stones of the Bronze Age, Iron Age hillforts, and a Roman villa. Four early medieval sites and 23 from the medieval post-Norman period cover defences, dwellings, stones and churches. Finally the modern period, beginning with an Elizabethan manor house, marks 400 years of industrial history, and ends at defenses from World War II. All of the sites on this list (and the whole of Bridgend County Borough) are within the historic county of Glamorgan.

Scheduled monuments have statutory protection. The compilation of the list is undertaken by Cadw Welsh Historic Monuments, which is an executive agency of the National Assembly of Wales. The list of scheduled monuments below is supplied by Cadw with additional material from RCAHMW and Glamorgan-Gwent Archaeological Trust.

Scheduled monuments in Bridgend

See also
List of Cadw properties
List of castles in Wales
List of hill forts in Wales
Historic houses in Wales
List of monastic houses in Wales
List of museums in Wales
List of Roman villas in Wales

References
Coflein is the online database of RCAHMW: Royal Commission on the Ancient and Historical Monuments of Wales, GGAT is the Glamorgan-Gwent Archaeological Trust, Cadw is the Welsh Historic Monuments Agency

Bridgend
Buildings and structures in Bridgend County Borough